The Mississippi State Bulldogs college football team represents Mississippi State University in the West Division of the Southeastern Conference (SEC). The Bulldogs compete as part of the NCAA Division I Football Bowl Subdivision. The program has had 35 head coaches since it began play during the 1895 season.

The team has played more than 1,050 games over 111 seasons. In that time, eleven coaches have led the Bulldogs in postseason bowl games: Ralph Sasse, Allyn McKeen, Paul E. Davis, Bob Tyler, Emory Bellard, Jackie Sherrill, Sylvester Croom, Dan Mullen, Joe Moorhead, Mike Leach, and Zach Arnett.  McKeen led the Bulldogs to their lone conference championship as a member of the SEC in 1941.

Sherrill is the leader in seasons coached and games won, with 75 victories during his 13 years with the program. McKeen has the highest winning percentage of those who have coached more than one game, with .764. W.M. Matthews and J.B. Hildebrand have the lowest winning percentage of those who have coached more than one game, with .000. Of the 35 different head coaches who have led the Bulldogs, Bernie Bierman, McKeen and Darrell Royal have been inducted as head coaches into the College Football Hall of Fame in South Bend, Indiana.

Key

Coaches

Notes

References 
General

 
 

Specific

Lists of college football head coaches
Mississippi State Bulldogs football coaches